The following outline is provided as an overview of and topical guide to Trinidad and Tobago:

Trinidad and Tobago – sovereign island nation located in the Lesser Antilles Archipelago in the southeastern Caribbean Sea. Trinidad and Tobago lies northeast of Venezuela and south of the island nation of Grenada.  It also shares maritime boundaries with Barbados to the northeast and Guyana to the southeast. The country covers an area of 5,128 square kilometers (1,979 sq mi) and consists of two main islands, Trinidad and Tobago, and numerous smaller landforms. Trinidad is the larger and more populous of the main islands; Tobago is much smaller, comprising about 6% of the total area and 4% of the population. The nation lies outside the hurricane belt.

Officially Trinidadians or Tobagonians, the people from Trinidad and Tobago are often informally referred to as Trinbagonians or Trinis (for Trinidadians). Unlike most of the English-speaking Caribbean, Trinidad and Tobago is a primarily industrialised country whose economy is based on petroleum and petrochemicals. Trinidad and Tobago is famous for its pre-Lenten Carnival and as the birthplace of steelpan, calypso, chutney, chutney-soca, pichakaree, chut-kai-pang, cariso, kaiso, parang, soca, and limbo.

General reference 

 Abbreviations: RTT, RofTT, TRI, TT
 Pronunciation: tri-nee-dad an To-bay-go
 Common English country name: Trinidad and Tobago
 Official English country name: The Republic of Trinidad and Tobago
 Common endonym(s): Trinidad and Tobago
 Official endonym(s): The Republic of Trinidad and Tobago
 Adjectives: Trinidadian, Tobagonian, Trinbagonian
 Demonym(s): Trinidadians, Tobagonians, Trinbagonians (colloquial), Trinis (colloquial)
 Etymology: Name of Trinidad and Tobago
 International rankings of Trinidad and Tobago
 ISO country codes: TT, TTO, 780
 ISO region codes: See ISO 3166-2:TT
 Internet country code top-level domain: .tt

Geography of Trinidad and Tobago 

 
Geography of Trinidad and Tobago
 Trinidad and Tobago is: an island country
 Location:
 Northern Hemisphere and Western Hemisphere
North America, Caribbean
 Atlantic Ocean
 North Atlantic
 Caribbean
 Antilles
 Lesser Antilles (island chain)
 Time zone:  Eastern Caribbean Time (UTC-04)
 Extreme points of Trinidad and Tobago
 High:  El Cerro del Aripo on Trinidad 
 Low:  Caribbean Sea 0 m
 Land boundaries:  none
 Coastline:  362 km
 Population of Trinidad and Tobago: 1,328,019 - 149th most populous country

 Area of Trinidad and Tobago: 5,128 km2
 Atlas of Trinidad and Tobago

Environment of Trinidad and Tobago 

Environment of Trinidad and Tobago
 Climate of Trinidad and Tobago
 Renewable energy in Trinidad and Tobago
 Geology of Trinidad and Tobago
 Protected areas of Trinidad and Tobago
 National parks of Trinidad and Tobago
 Wildlife of Trinidad and Tobago
 Endemic flora of Trinidad and Tobago
 Fauna of Trinidad and Tobago
 Birds of Trinidad and Tobago
 Mammals of Trinidad and Tobago
 Snakes of Trinidad and Tobago
 Butterflies of Tobago

Natural geographic features of Trinidad and Tobago 

 Islands of Trinidad and Tobago
 Lakes of Trinidad and Tobago
 Mountains of Trinidad and Tobago
 Volcanoes in Trinidad and Tobago
 Rivers of Trinidad and Tobago
 Waterfalls of Trinidad and Tobago
 Valleys of Trinidad and Tobago
 World Heritage Sites in Trinidad and Tobago: None

Regions of Trinidad and Tobago

Ecoregions of Trinidad and Tobago 

List of ecoregions in Trinidad and Tobago
 Ecoregions in Trinidad and Tobago

Demography of Trinidad and Tobago 

Demographics of Trinidad and Tobago

Government and politics of Trinidad and Tobago 

Politics of Trinidad and Tobago
 Form of government:
 Capital of Trinidad and Tobago: Port of Spain
 Elections in Trinidad and Tobago
 Political parties in Trinidad and Tobago

Branches of the government of Trinidad and Tobago 

Government of Trinidad and Tobago

Executive branch of the government of Trinidad and Tobago 
 Head of state: President of Trinidad and Tobago,
 Head of government: Prime Minister of Trinidad and Tobago,
 Cabinet of Trinidad and Tobago

Legislative branch of the government of Trinidad and Tobago 

 Parliament of Trinidad and Tobago (bicameral)
 Upper house: Senate of Trinidad and Tobago
 Lower house: House of Representatives of Trinidad and Tobago

Judicial branch of the government of Trinidad and Tobago 

Court system of Trinidad and Tobago
 Supreme Court of Trinidad and Tobago

Foreign relations of Trinidad and Tobago 

Foreign relations of Trinidad and Tobago
 Diplomatic missions in Trinidad and Tobago
 Diplomatic missions of Trinidad and Tobago

International organization membership 
The Republic of Trinidad and Tobago is a member of:

African, Caribbean, and Pacific Group of States (ACP)
Agency for the Prohibition of Nuclear Weapons in Latin America and the Caribbean (OPANAL)
Caribbean Community and Common Market (Caricom)
Caribbean Development Bank (CDB)
Commonwealth of Nations
Food and Agriculture Organization (FAO)
Group of 24 (G24)
Group of 77 (G77)
Inter-American Development Bank (IADB)
International Bank for Reconstruction and Development (IBRD)
International Civil Aviation Organization (ICAO)
International Criminal Court (ICCt)
International Criminal Police Organization (Interpol)
International Development Association (IDA)
International Federation of Red Cross and Red Crescent Societies (IFRCS)
International Finance Corporation (IFC)
International Fund for Agricultural Development (IFAD)
International Hydrographic Organization (IHO)
International Labour Organization (ILO)
International Maritime Organization (IMO)
International Monetary Fund (IMF)
International Olympic Committee (IOC)

International Organization for Standardization (ISO)
International Red Cross and Red Crescent Movement (ICRM)
International Telecommunication Union (ITU)
International Telecommunications Satellite Organization (ITSO)
International Trade Union Confederation (ITUC)
Latin American Economic System (LAES)
Multilateral Investment Guarantee Agency (MIGA)
Nonaligned Movement (NAM)
Organisation for the Prohibition of Chemical Weapons (OPCW)
Organization of American States (OAS)
United Nations (UN)
United Nations Conference on Trade and Development (UNCTAD)
United Nations Educational, Scientific, and Cultural Organization (UNESCO)
United Nations Industrial Development Organization (UNIDO)
Universal Postal Union (UPU)
World Confederation of Labour (WCL)
World Customs Organization (WCO)
World Federation of Trade Unions (WFTU)
World Health Organization (WHO)
World Intellectual Property Organization (WIPO)
World Meteorological Organization (WMO)
World Trade Organization (WTO)

Law and order in Trinidad and Tobago 

Law of Trinidad and Tobago
 Constitution of Trinidad and Tobago
 Savings clause
 Modification clause
 Crime in Trinidad and Tobago
 Human rights in Trinidad and Tobago
 LGBT rights in Trinidad and Tobago
 Freedom of religion in Trinidad and Tobago
 Law enforcement in Trinidad and Tobago

Military of Trinidad and Tobago 

Military of Trinidad and Tobago
 Command
 Commander-in-chief: President
 Ministry of National Security of Trinidad and Tobago
 Forces
 Army of Trinidad and Tobago
 Coast Guard of Trinidad and Tobago
 Air Force of Trinidad and Tobago

Local government in Trinidad and Tobago 

Local government in Trinidad and Tobago

History of Trinidad and Tobago 

History of Trinidad and Tobago
Trinidad and Tobago was founded by Christopher Columbus, in 1962.

Culture of Trinidad and Tobago 

Culture of Trinidad and Tobago
 Cuisine of Trinidad and Tobago
 National symbols of Trinidad and Tobago
 Coat of arms of Trinidad and Tobago
 Flag of Trinidad and Tobago
 National anthem of Trinidad and Tobago
 Languages of Trinidad and Tobago
 Prostitution in Trinidad and Tobago
 Public holidays in Trinidad and Tobago
 Religion in Trinidad and Tobago
 Christianity in Trinidad and Tobago
Roman Catholicism in Trinidad and Tobago
Anglican Diocese of Trinidad and Tobago
 Hinduism in Trinidad and Tobago
 Islam in Trinidad and Tobago
 World Heritage Sites in Trinidad and Tobago: None

Art in Trinidad and Tobago 
 Literature of Trinidad and Tobago
 Music of Trinidad and Tobago
 Television in Trinidad and Tobago

Sports in Trinidad and Tobago 

Sports in Trinidad and Tobago
 Football in Trinidad and Tobago
 Trinidad and Tobago at the Olympics

Economy and infrastructure of Trinidad and Tobago 

Economy of Trinidad and Tobago
 Economic rank, by nominal GDP (2007): 91st (ninety-first)
 Banking in Trinidad and Tobago
 Central Bank of Trinidad and Tobago
 Communications in Trinidad and Tobago
 Internet in Trinidad and Tobago
 Companies of Trinidad and Tobago
Currency of Trinidad and Tobago: Dollar
ISO 4217: TTD
 Transport in Trinidad and Tobago
 Trinidad and Tobago Stock Exchange

Education in Trinidad and Tobago 

Education in Trinidad and Tobago
 List of schools in Trinidad and Tobago

Infrastructure of Trinidad and Tobago 
 Health care in Trinidad and Tobago
 Transportation in Trinidad and Tobago
 Airports in Trinidad and Tobago
 Rail transport in Trinidad and Tobago
 Water supply and sanitation in Trinidad and Tobago

See also 

Index of Trinidad and Tobago-related articles
List of international rankings
List of Trinidad and Tobago-related topics
Member states of the Commonwealth of Nations
Member state of the United Nations
Outline of geography
Outline of North America
Outline of South America

References

External links 

 Government
Trinidad and Tobago Government Portal Gateway to Government Websites
Official Trinidad and Tobago Tourism Website
Official Parliament Website
National Library Information Systems Website

 Other

Trinidad and Tobago
Trinidad and Tobago